Live Healthy, Be Happy is an Australian lifestyle television series airs on the Seven Network on 3 February 2013. It's hosted by Geoff Huegill.

References 

Seven Network original programming
Australian non-fiction television series
2013 Australian television series debuts
2013 Australian television series endings